Alliance High School may refer to:

In Iran 
 Alliance School, Hamadan
 Alliance School, Kermanshah
 Alliance School, Tehran

In Kenya 
 Alliance High School (Kenya), Kikuyu
 Alliance Girls High School, Kikuyu

In the United States 
 Alliance High School (Ohio), Ohio 
 Alliance High School (Oregon), Oregon
 The Alliance School, Milwaukee